Applied Energy is a peer-reviewed academic journal covering research on energy engineering that was established in 1975. The journal covers areas of energy conversion and conservation, the optimal use of energy resources, analysis and optimization of energy processes, mitigation of environmental pollutants, and sustainable energy systems. The Editor-in-Chiefs are Jianzhong Wu and Zita Vale.

According to the Journal Citation Reports, the journal has a 2021 impact factor of 11.446, ranking it 6 out of 143 journals in the category "Engineering, Chemical".

References

External links 
 
 

Elsevier academic journals
Publications established in 1975
English-language journals
Energy and fuel journals